Marinika Babanazarova is an Uzbekistani museologist and curator, mostly known for being a director of Nukus Museum of Art for thirty years after death of its founder Igor Savitsky.

Biography 

Babanazarova was born on September 7, 1955 in the family of a philologist scholar, the first Karakalpak fellow of the Academy of Sciences of the Uzbek SSR and a major Communist party functionary Marat Nurmukhamedov. She graduated from the Faculty of Roman-Germanic Philology of Tashkent State University with a degree in English Philology and from the art history department of the Ostrovsky Tashkent Theater and Art Institute with a degree in art criticism. Her graduation thesis was about Igor Savitsky as an artist, art historian, and creator of the museum. Babanazarova worked as an English teacher at Nukus State University from 1977 till 1983.

In 1983–1984, she was the scientific secretary and chief curator of the Karakalpak State Museum of Art in Nukus (at present, the Savitsky State Museum of Art).

From 1984 to September 2015 - Director of the Karakalpak State Museum of Art. Headed the museum after the death of its founder, friend of her father, Igor Savitsky. During the directorship of Mariniki, the Savitskiy Museum received world fame and the metaphorical name "Louvre in the Desert" - for its unique (second in the world) collection of the Russian avant-garde in a place that was unexpected to foreigners.

Internship at the Louvre (1998), British Museum (2000); She studied museums in the United States (1993), France (1998), Austria (2002), Sweden (1999, 2003) and Holland (2007).

From 1998 to 2015 she was a member of the Central Election Commission of the Republic of Uzbekistan.

Bibliography

Books

Awards 
 1996 Ordre "Dustlik", Uzbekistan
 2013 Ordre des Arts et des Lettres, France.

References 

Museum directors
People from Karakalpakstan
Living people
1955 births